Lanpher is a surname. Notable people with the surname include:

 Diane Lanpher (born 1955), American politician
 Edward G. Lanpher (born 1942), American diplomat
 Katherine Lanpher (born 1959), American writer, journalist, broadcaster, and podcaster